Preludes for Piano is a set of four short pieces for piano solo composed by John Ireland between 1913 and 1915. They were published in the latter year.

The pieces, with typical timings, are:

 The Undertone (3 minutes) 
 Obsession (3 minutes) 
 The Holy Boy (composed on Christmas Day 1913; subtitled A Carol of the Nativity; 4 minutes) 
 Fire of Spring (2 minutes) 

The Holy Boy is one of Ireland's best-known works, along with his setting of the hymn "My Song Is Love Unknown". It has been arranged for a variety of forces. One version is the Christmas carol "Lowly, laid in a manger / With oxen brooding nigh" with words by Herbert S. Brown.

References

External links

Solo piano pieces by John Ireland
1915 compositions
Ireland, John